Abdul Tebazalwa (born 30 September 1979) is a Ugandan former professional boxer who competed from 2003 to 2014, winning the African super bantamweight title in 2006. As an amateur, he competed in the men's bantamweight event at the 2000 Summer Olympics.

Professional boxing record

References

External links
 

1979 births
Living people
Ugandan male boxers
Olympic boxers of Uganda
Boxers at the 2000 Summer Olympics
Place of birth missing (living people)
African Games medalists in boxing
Bantamweight boxers
African Boxing Union champions
Featherweight boxers
Super-bantamweight boxers
Ugandan emigrants to Sweden
Sportspeople from Stockholm
African Games gold medalists for Uganda
Competitors at the 1999 All-Africa Games